John Hector Clark House is a historic home located at Clarkton, Bladen County, North Carolina.  It was built about 1865, and is a one-story, board-and-batten "coastal cottage".  It features a broad gable roof and full-facade engaged front porch. It was moved to the present site in 1928–1929, and realigned in 1932.  The town of Clarkton is named for John Hector Clark (1821–1898).

It was added to the National Register of Historic Places in 1987.

References

Houses on the National Register of Historic Places in North Carolina
Greek Revival houses in North Carolina
Houses completed in 1865
Houses in Bladen County, North Carolina
National Register of Historic Places in Bladen County, North Carolina
1860s establishments in North Carolina